, is a women's football competition for universities across Japan. Under the same format as the men's university championship, it's currently held with 24 participating university teams. The competition was for the first time held on 1992, following the beginning of football professionalization in Japan and the intent of developing football to a high level in both men's and women's football, also including the youth championship. The championship is organized by the Japan Football Association and the Japan University Women Football Association.

Past winners
Past winners are:

See also

 Football in Japan
 Women's football in Japan
 Japan Football Association (JFA)

 Japanese association football league system
 WE League (I)
 Nadeshiko League
 Nadeshiko League Division 1 (II)
 Nadeshiko League Division 2 (III)
 Regional Leagues (IV)
 Empress's Cup (National Cup)
 Nadeshiko League Cup (League Cup)

References

External links
 Official website, JFA.jp 

Japan
Women's football competitions in Japan
Football cup competitions in Japan
All Japan Women's University Football Championship
Youth football competitions
Youth football in Japan
Recurring sporting events established in 1992